Jessica Parker may refer to:

Jessica Parker Kennedy (born 1984), Canadian actress
Sarah Jessica Parker (born 1965), American actress
Jessica "Jess" Parker, a Chilean drag queen who competed on season one of The Switch Drag Race.
Jessica Parker, BBC reporter